Najac is a commune in the Aveyron department in southern France. Najac station has rail connections to Toulouse, Figeac and Aurillac.

Najac village is set along a ridge above a bend in the river Aveyron. In the earlier part of the last century the village had around 2,000 people but it suffered marked population decline as workers migrated to towns and cities.  Several films concern the village and its surrounds, for example, La Vie Comme Elle Va.

The village economy, once famous for ham, is based largely on tourism and agriculture. Most land in the commune is still used for farming and there are a significant number of long-term inhabitants. During the summer, the population increases significantly due to second home owners and holiday-makers. Most holiday home owners are British, Canadian, Dutch or from the north of France.

The village is known for historic buildings and apparent medieval character. A partly ruined château dominates; it was built by villagers in 1253 on the orders of Alphonse de Poitiers. The 13th century Eglise Saint-Jean, built by villagers as a punishment for Cathar beliefs, overlooks the lower village, while at the other end, the faubourg has the typical architecture of many bastide villages with timber-framed houses and commercial arcades around an open area.

Najac is also one of the 140 or so Plus Beaux Villages de France (most beautiful villages of France), which in addition to ensuring its tourism status, brings money to maintain the village.

Population

See also
Communes of the Aveyron department
List of medieval bridges in France

References

External links

 A Short Tour of Najac

Communes of Aveyron
Plus Beaux Villages de France
Aveyron communes articles needing translation from French Wikipedia